Chinoz is a city in Tashkent Region, Uzbekistan. It is the administrative center of Chinoz District. It has an altitude of 269 m above the sea level. Its population is 23,700 (2016).

References

Populated places in Tashkent Region
Cities in Uzbekistan